Illinois's 3rd House of Representatives district is a Representative district within the Illinois House of Representatives located in Cook County, Illinois. It has been represented by Democrat Eva-Dina Delgado since November 15, 2019. The district was previously represented by Democrat Luis Arroyo from 2007 to 2019.

The district covers parts of Chicago and of Chicago's neighborhoods, it covers all or parts of Belmont Cragin, Dunning, Hermosa, Humboldt Park, Logan Square, Montclare, Portage Park, and West Town.

Representative district history

Prominent representatives

List of representatives

1849 – 1873

1957 – 1973

1983 – Present

Historic District Boundaries

Electoral history

2030 – 2022

2020 – 2012

2010 – 2002

2000 – 1992

1990 – 1982

1970 – 1962

1960 – 1956

Notes

References

Government of Chicago
Illinois House of Representatives districts